Francisco Becerra (c. 1545–1605) was a Spanish architect. Born in Trujillo (Extremadura), he designed and worked on several cathedrals in the New World.

Becerra either designed the Puebla Cathedral, or worked on building it to designs by Claudio de Arciniega.  He also built several convents in Puebla. He also designed a cathedral in Lima, Peru, a church in Cuzco and several bridges.

References

1540s births
1605 deaths
People from Tierra de Trujillo
16th-century Spanish architects
Medieval Spanish architects